The 2021–22 UEFA Champions League was the 67th season of Europe's premier club football tournament organised by UEFA, and the 30th season since it was renamed from the European Champion Clubs' Cup to the UEFA Champions League.

Real Madrid defeated Liverpool 1–0 in the final, which was played at the Stade de France in Saint-Denis, France, for a record-extending 14th title, and their fifth in nine years. It was originally scheduled to be played at the Allianz Arena in Munich, Germany. However, due to the postponement and relocation of the 2020 final, the final hosts were shifted back a year, with Saint Petersburg scheduled to host the 2022 final. Due to the Russian invasion of Ukraine, the final was eventually moved to Saint-Denis. As the winners, Real Madrid automatically qualified for the 2022–23 UEFA Champions League group stage, earned the right to play against the winners of the 2021–22 UEFA Europa League, Eintracht Frankfurt, in the 2022 UEFA Super Cup, and earned a spot in the 2022 FIFA Club World Cup.

Chelsea were the defending champions, but were eliminated in the quarter-finals by eventual winners Real Madrid.

This season was the first since 1999–2000 (the first season after the dissolution of the UEFA Cup Winners' Cup) where three major European club competitions (UEFA Champions League, UEFA Europa League, and the newly created UEFA Europa Conference League) are organised by UEFA. No changes were made to the format of the Champions League, but teams that were eliminated from the preliminary round and first qualifying round of the Champions League were now transferred to the Europa Conference League instead of the Europa League.

On 24 June 2021, UEFA approved the proposal to abolish the away goals rule in all UEFA club competitions, which had been used since 1965. Accordingly, if in a two-legged tie two teams scored the same number of aggregate goals, the winner of the tie would not be decided by the number of away goals scored by each team but always by 30 minutes of extra time, and if the two teams scored the same amount of goals in extra time, the winner would be decided by a penalty shoot-out.

Association team allocation
A total of 80 teams from 54 of the 55 UEFA member associations participated in the 2021–22 UEFA Champions League (the exception being Liechtenstein, which did not organise a domestic league). The association ranking based on the UEFA association coefficients was used to determine the number of participating teams for each association:
Associations 1–4 each had four teams qualify.
Associations 5–6 each had three teams qualify.
Associations 7–15 each had two teams qualify.
Associations 16–55 (except Liechtenstein) each had one team qualify.
The winners of the 2020–21 UEFA Champions League and 2020–21 UEFA Europa League were each given an additional entry if they did not qualify for the 2021–22 UEFA Champions League through their own domestic league. (As Chelsea, the Champions League title holders, did qualify through their own domestic league this season, the additional entry for the Champions League title holders was re-allocated.)

Association ranking
For the 2021–22 UEFA Champions League, the associations were allocated places according to their 2020 UEFA association coefficients, which took into account their performance in European competitions from 2015–16 to 2019–20.

Apart from the allocation based on the association coefficients, associations could have additional teams participating in the Champions League, as noted below:
 – Additional berth for UEFA Europa League title holders

Distribution
The following is the access list for this season. As the Champions League title holders, Chelsea, which were guaranteed a berth in the Champions League group stage, already qualified via their domestic league (as fourth place in the 2020-21 Premier League), the following changes to the access list were made:
The champions of association 11 (Turkey) enter the group stage instead of the play-off round.
The champions of association 13 (Denmark) enter the play-off round instead of the third qualifying round.
The champions of association 15 (Czech Republic) enter the third qualifying round instead of the second qualifying round.
The champions of associations 18 (Greece) and 19 (Serbia) enter the second qualifying round instead of the first qualifying round.

Teams
The labels in the parentheses show how each team qualified for the place of its starting round:
TH: Champions League title holders
EL: Europa League title holders
1st, 2nd, 3rd, 4th, etc.: League positions of the previous season
Abd-: League positions of abandoned season due to the COVID-19 pandemic in Europe as determined by the national association; all teams were subject to approval by UEFA as per the guidelines for entry to European competitions in response to the COVID-19 pandemic.

The second qualifying round, third qualifying round and play-off round were divided into Champions Path (CH) and League Path (LP).

CC: 2021 UEFA club coefficients.

Notes

Schedule
All matches were played on Tuesdays and Wednesdays apart from the preliminary round final, which was played on a Friday, and the final, which was played on a Saturday. The third qualifying round second legs were only played on a Tuesday due to the 2021 UEFA Super Cup on the following Wednesday. Scheduled kick-off times starting from the play-off round were 18:45 (instead of 18:55 previously) and 21:00 CEST/CET.

All draws were held at UEFA headquarters in Nyon, Switzerland, except the group stage draw, which took place in Istanbul, Turkey, on 26 August 2021.

Qualifying rounds

Preliminary round

First qualifying round

Second qualifying round

Third qualifying round

Play-off round

Group stage

The draw for the group stage was held in Istanbul, Turkey, on 26 August 2021. The 32 teams were drawn into eight groups of four. For the draw, the teams were seeded into four pots, each of eight teams, based on the following principles:
Pot 1 contained the Champions League and Europa League title holders, and the champions of the top six associations based on their 2020 UEFA country coefficients.
Pot 2, 3 and 4 contained the remaining teams, seeded based on their 2021 UEFA club coefficients.
Teams from the same association, and due to political reasons, teams from Ukraine and Russia, could not be drawn into the same group. Before the draw, UEFA formed pairings of teams from the same association (one pairing for associations with two or three teams, two pairings for associations with four or five teams) based on television audiences, where one team was drawn into Groups A–D and another team was drawn into Groups E–H, so that the two teams would play on different days.

The matches were played on 14–15 September, 28–29 September, 19–20 October, 2–3 November, 23–24 November, and 7–9 December 2021. The top two teams of each group advanced to the round of 16. The third-placed teams were transferred to the Europa League knockout round play-offs, while the fourth-placed teams were eliminated from European competitions for the season.

Sheriff Tiraspol made their debut appearance in the group stage. They were the first team from Moldova to play in the Champions League group stage.

Group A

Group B

Group C

Group D

Group E

Group F

Group G

Group H

Knockout phase

In the knockout phase, teams played against each other over two legs on a home-and-away basis, except for the one-match final.

Bracket

Round of 16

Quarter-finals

Semi-finals

Final

Statistics
Statistics exclude qualifying rounds and play-off round.

Top goalscorers

Top assists

Team of the season
The UEFA technical study group selected the following players as the team of the tournament.

Player of the Season
  Karim Benzema ( Real Madrid)

Young Player of the Season
  Vinícius Júnior ( Real Madrid)

European Super League controversy

On 18 April 2021, UEFA, the Football Association, the Premier League, the Italian Football Federation, Serie A, the Royal Spanish Football Federation and La Liga learned of plans from several English, Italian and Spanish clubs to create the European Super League. UEFA and the national associations announced that if such a league were to be established, its participants would be banned from playing in international and domestic competitions. Later that same day, English clubs (Arsenal, Chelsea, Liverpool, Manchester City, Manchester United and Tottenham Hotspur), Italian clubs (Inter Milan, Juventus and AC Milan) and Spanish clubs (Atlético Madrid, Barcelona and Real Madrid) announced the establishment of the Super League, putting them at risk of being banned.

On 20 April 2021, Arsenal, Liverpool, Manchester City, Manchester United and Tottenham Hotspur withdrew after the Football Association threatened to ban participating clubs from domestic football, whilst Chelsea withdrew some hours later. This led to the project's collapse, as Atlético Madrid, Inter Milan and AC Milan followed the English clubs by withdrawing. The Super League suspended its operations, with the case to be taken by the Court of Justice of the European Union (CJEU) to establish whether UEFA and FIFA have the exclusive right to organise competitions.

On 7 June 2021, the Swiss Federal Department of Justice and Police notified UEFA and FIFA of the Spanish precautionary measure – which had earlier issued an injunction against UEFA and FIFA and referred a cuestión preliminar (English: preliminary question) to the CJEU on whether UEFA and FIFA have violated articles 101 and 102 of the TFEU – ruling that neither governing body could not execute sanctions against Super League clubs. On 15 June 2021, it was officially confirmed that the remaining three clubs (Barcelona, Juventus and Real Madrid) – which did not sign the Commitment Declaration of the sanctioned other nine clubs and filed a new motion to scrap the agreement UEFA signed with those nine clubs – were admitted to the 2021–22 UEFA Champions League, pending the disciplinary proceedings UEFA opened against them but which were suspended after the Swiss notification.

See also
2021–22 UEFA Europa League
2021–22 UEFA Europa Conference League
2022 UEFA Super Cup
2021–22 UEFA Women's Champions League
2021–22 UEFA Youth League
2021–22 UEFA Futsal Champions League

Notes

References

External links

Official Technical Report

 
1
2021-22
Sports events affected by the 2022 Russian invasion of Ukraine